| tries = {{#expr:

 + 3 + 1 + 4 + 2
 + 3 + 1 + 9 +11
 + 3 + 8 + 5 + 3
 + 3 + 8 +14 + 8
 + 6 + 6 + 3 + 6
 + 8 +10 + 5 + 5
 + 4 + 7 + 1 + 6

 + 2 + 3 + 7 + 9
 + 5 + 5 + 5 + 3
 + 1 + 2 + 4 + 6
 + 2 + 4 + 6 + 4
 + 4 + 5 + 7 + 4
 + 5 + 5 + 5 + 5
 + 4 + 7 + 3 + 0

 + 1 + 4 + 3 + 4
 + 6 + 5
 + 4
}}
| top point scorer = Brendan Laney (Edinburgh)137 points
| top try scorer = Mossie Lawlor (Munster)Craig Morgan (Cardiff)Mike Mullins (Munster)6 tries
| website = www.rabodirectpro12.com
| prevseason = 2001–02
| nextseason = 2003–04
}}
The 2002–03 Celtic League was the second season of the Celtic League, a rugby union tournament involving teams from Ireland, Scotland and Wales.

Teams

Pool stage 
The teams were split into two pools and the pool stage consisted of a single round-robin; each team played the others in its pool once only.

Pool A Table

Pool A Fixtures

Pool B Table

Pool B Fixtures

Knockout stages

Quarter finals

Semi finals

Final

Leading scorers
Note: Flags to the left of player names indicate national team as has been defined under IRB eligibility rules, or primary nationality for players who have not yet earned international senior caps. Players may hold one or more non-IRB nationalities.

Top points scorers

Top try scorers

Notes

External links
 Results from official website

References 

 
2002-03
 
Celtic
Celtic
Celtic